The R152 road is a regional road in Ireland, linking the N2 in County Meath to Drogheda in County Louth via the town of Duleek. 

See also
Roads in Ireland
National primary road
National secondary road

References
Roads Act 1993 (Classification of Regional Roads) Order 2006 – Department of Transport

Regional roads in the Republic of Ireland
Roads in County Meath
Roads in County Louth